Orthis striatula is an extinct species of brachiopods. The fossils are present in the middle Devonian.

References 

Prehistoric brachiopods
Rhynchonellata